Psych-Out is a 1968 counterculture film. 

Psych Out, Psychout, or Psyche-Out may also refer to:
"Psych Out" (NCIS), an episode of NCIS
Psychout Records, a Swedish independent record label
Psyche-Out, a character from the G.I. Joe franchise